Air Caribbean may refer to:

 Air Caribbean (Puerto Rico), an airline from Puerto Rico
 Air Caribbean (Trinidad and Tobago), an airline from Trinidad and Tobago